Johann Müllner (20 July 1932 – 3 October 2022) was an Austrian farmer and politician.

Müllner died on 3 October 2022, at the age of 90.

References

1932 births
2022 deaths
Austrian farmers
Members of the Landtag of Burgenland
Social Democratic Party of Austria politicians
People from Neusiedl am See District